Heart 00s is a national digital radio station owned and operated by Global Media & Entertainment as a spin-off from the Heart radio network. The station broadcasts from studios at Leicester Square in London and was launched on 20 May 2022. Heart 00s has its own dedicated breakfast show, presented by Mike Panteli. Ashley Roberts of the Pussycat Dolls is also a presenter, with a programme airing on Saturday evenings. At other times, the station is mostly an automated service. The station is available on the Digital One multiplex while Global migrated Capital Xtra Reloaded to being available via DAB+ in London only to make way for the launch of Heart 00s.

Current presenters
Current presenters include: 
Ashley Roberts
Kelly Brook
Rachel Stevens
 Mike Panteli

See also
Heart 70s
Heart 80s
Heart 90s
Heart Dance

References

External links

1990s
Global Radio
Radio stations established in 2022
2000s-themed radio stations